Reckless is an American legal drama television series directed by Catherine Hardwicke and written by Dana Stevens. The series stars Anna Wood, Cam Gigandet, Adam Rodríguez, Shawn Hatosy, Kim Wayans, Gregory Harrison, Michael Gladis, and Georgina Haig. It premiered on CBS on June 29, 2014.

On October 9, 2014, CBS canceled the series after one season.

Cast

Main
 Anna Wood as Jamie Sawyer, a lawyer originally from Chicago
 Cam Gigandet as Roy Rayder, city attorney for the City of Charleston and a partner in Dec's firm
 Shawn Hatosy as Terry McCandless, a detective in the Charleston PD
 Georgina Haig as Lee Anne Marcus, a waitress and former Charleston PD officer and Jamie's client
 Adam Rodríguez as Preston Cruz, a detective within the Charleston PD and Jamie's ex-boyfriend
 Michael Gladis as Holland Knox, Deputy Chief of the Charleston PD and mayoral candidate
 Kim Wayans as Vi Briggs, Jamie's paralegal employee at her law firm, who serves as the firm's private investigator
 Gregory Harrison as Decatur "Dec" Fortnum, a lawyer and Roy's ex-father-in-law and his partner at their law firm

Recurring
 Bess Armstrong as Roy's mother, Melinda.
 Falk Hentschel as Lee Anne's husband, Arliss Fulton.
 Kelly Rutherford as Joyce Reed, a councilwoman in Charleston who is running for mayor against Knox.
 Rick Gomez as Russ Waterman, a shady businessman who runs an underground counterfeit weapons ring in Charleston, and sells illegal weapons to the corrupt cops in the Charleston PD.
 David Keith as Terry's father, Pat.
 Emily Baldoni as Nancy Davis, a local television news reporter in Charleston who briefly dated Roy.
 Linda Purl as Decatur's wife, Barbara.
 Susan Walters as Decatur's mistress, Lindsay.
 Owen Teague as Jacob.

Development and production
In March 2013, Georgina Haig and Kim Wayans were the first to be cast as Lee Anne, a police officer from the Charleston PD and Vi, Jamie's paralegal. Shawn Hatosy was cast next as Terry, a police detective in the Charleston PD. Shortly after Anna Wood was cast in the lead female role of Jamie, a gorgeous Yankee litigator as well as Adam Rodriguez as Preston, a well respected police detective who works alongside Terry within the Charleston PD.

On May 12, 2013, Reckless was picked up by CBS for a pilot order with a series order coming shortly after. Shooting for the pilot began on March 22, 2013, in Charleston, South Carolina.

Reception
Reckless has received mixed reviews. On Metacritic, the show holds a score of 46 out of 100, based on 15 critics, indicating "mixed or average" reviews. On Rotten Tomatoes, the show holds a rating of 46% based on 13 reviews.

Episodes

Ratings

Reckless premiered to 3.99 million viewers and at 0.6 in the 18-49 demo. The least watched episode is the twelfth, "Civil Wars: (Part 1)", with 2.92 million viewers. The most watched episode to date is the eleventh, "And So It Begins", with a series high of 4.68 million viewers.

Beginning July 13, the show moved from 9:00 pm Sunday to 10:00 pm Sunday.

U.S. live ratings

Home media 
The full complete series was released on DVD as for CBS Home Entertainment on April 14, 2020.

International broadcast 
The program premiered on Network Ten in Australia on October 8, 2014, rating a very low 79,000 viewers.
In Latin America the series premiered on Cinemax on August 5, 2014. Alibi secured the airing rights in the United Kingdom, and were to begin airing the show from April 10, 2015, at 9 p.m.

References

External links
 
 

2014 American television series debuts
2014 American television series endings
2010s American crime drama television series
2010s American legal television series
English-language television shows
CBS original programming
Television series by CBS Studios
Television shows set in Charleston, South Carolina